Procolina is an extinct genus of procolophonid parareptile known from partial remains found in Early Triassic (Olenekian age) rocks of Czatkowice 1, Poland. It was first named by Magdalena Borsuk−Białynicka; and Mariusz Lubka in 2009 and the type species is Procolina teresae

References

Procolophonines
Triassic parareptiles
Fossil taxa described in 2009
Early Triassic reptiles of Europe
Prehistoric reptile genera